The Aid class of Royal Navy ships were the only purpose-built auxiliary ships constructed for the Navy during the Napoleonic Wars.   The vessels were designed in 1808 by the Surveyors of the Navy for both transport and storage.

References

Ship classes of the Royal Navy